Charbin may refer to:

 Charbin, Iran
 Charbin, Poland

See also

Charlin (name)